Lake Area Technical College (Lake Area Tech) is a public community college in Watertown, South Dakota. The campus covers 40 acres and serves an area of 18,000 square miles. Founded in 1965, Lake Area Tech was the first technical school to be established in South Dakota, followed by schools in Mitchell, Sioux Falls and Rapid City. Lake Area Tech is accredited by the Higher Learning Commission.

Campus 
Due to the increasing number of students, the school completed a four-phase campus expansion project in 2013. The project included a new Diesel, Energy, and Welding facility, a new Automotive and Health Science Facility, a centralized Student Center, and a new Agriculture facility. To continue to manage the increase in student population, Lake Area Tech completed a flex space 'The Lab' in 2018 and has constructed a new facility on campus that houses all of the healthcare programs. The new Prairie Lakes Healthcare Center of Learning opened Fall 2020.

Academics 
Lake Area Tech has 30 programs of study, including 15 online degrees, and serves more than 2,600 full-time, part-time, and online students. Some of the school's longstanding programs include Agriculture, Welding, Cosmetology, Diesel, Aviation, and Nursing. The school has a 17:1 student/faculty ratio and a 99% graduate placement rate.

Lake Area Tech's programs rely on advisory boards of industry leaders and professionals, who also supply training equipment and internships. For example, Diesel, Auto, HPEM, and Agriculture students have access to a truck chassis dynamometer for hands-on training. Lake Area Tech also has a cadaver lab. Examples of LATC business partners include Butler CAT Corporation, Prairie Lakes Health Care System, Titan Machinery, Agtegra Cooperative, CHS, Building Products Inc, Missouri River Energy, Ottertail Power, Watertown Municipal Utilities, Valley Queen Cheese, Horton Manufacturing, First Bank and Trust, and the Watertown Community Foundation.

Awards 
In March 2017, Lake Area Tech was named the winner of the 2017 Aspen Prize for Community College Excellence, following three previous Finalist-With-Distinction honors in 2011, 2013, and 2015.  The prize was awarded by the Aspen Institute in March 2017.

References

External links
 
 

Buildings and structures in Watertown, South Dakota
Education in Codington County, South Dakota
Community colleges in South Dakota
1965 establishments in the United States
Two-year colleges in the United States